Sally Mann HonFRPS (born Sally Turner Munger; May 1, 1951) is an American photographer who has made large format black and white photographs—at first of her young children, then later of landscapes suggesting decay and death.

Early life and education
Born in Lexington, Virginia, Mann was the third of three children. Her father, Robert S. Munger, was a general practitioner, and her mother, Elizabeth Evans Munger, ran the bookstore at Washington and Lee University in Lexington. Mann was raised by an atheist and compassionate father who allowed Mann to be "benignly neglected". Mann was introduced to photography by her father, who encouraged her interest in photography; his 5x7 camera became the basis of her use of large format cameras today.  Mann began to photograph when she was sixteen. Most of her photographs and writings are tied to Lexington, Virginia. Mann graduated from The Putney School in 1969, and attended Bennington College and Friends World College. She earned a BA, summa cum laude, from Hollins College (now Hollins University) in 1974 and a MA in creative writing in 1975.
She took up photography at Putney where, she claims, her motive was to be alone in the darkroom with her boyfriend. She made her photographic debut at Putney with an image of a nude classmate. Mann has never had any formal training in photography and  she "never read[s] about photography".

Early career
After graduation from Hollins College, Mann worked as a photographer at Washington and Lee University. In the mid-1970s she photographed the construction of its new law school building, the Lewis Hall (now the Sydney Lewis Hall), leading to her first solo exhibition in late 1977 at the Corcoran Gallery of Art in Washington, DC The Corcoran Gallery of Art published a catalogue of Mann's images titled "The Lewis Law Portfolio". Some of those surrealistic images were also included as part of her first book, Second Sight, published in 1984. While Mann explored a variety of genres as she was maturing in the 1970s, she truly found her trade with her book, At Twelve: Portraits of Young Women (Aperture, 1988).
 
In 1995, she was featured in an issue of "Aperture". On Location with: Henri Cartier-Bresson, Graciela Iturbide, Barbara Kruger, Sally Mann, Andres Serrano, Clarissa Sligh" which was illustrated with photographs.

At Twelve: Portraits of Young Women

 
Her second collection, At Twelve: Portraits of Young Women, published in 1988, stimulated minor controversy. The images "captured the confusing emotions and developing identities of adolescent girls [and the] expressive printing style lent a dramatic and brooding mood to all of her images". In the preface to the book, Ann Beattie says "when a girl is twelve years old, she often wants – or says she wants – less involvement with adults. […] [it is] a time in which the girls yearn for freedom and adults feel their own grip on things becoming a little tenuous, as they realize that they have to let their children go." Beattie says that Mann's photographs don't "glamorize the world, but they don't make it into something more unpleasant than it is, either". The girls photographed in this series are shown "vulnerable in their youthfulness" but Mann instead focuses on the strength that the girls possess.
 
In one image from the book shown here, Mann says that the young girl was extremely reluctant to stand closer to her mother's boyfriend. Mann said that she thought it was strange because "it was their peculiar familiarity that had provoked this photograph in the first place". Mann didn't want to crop out the girl's elbow but the girl refused to move in closer. According to Mann, the girl's mother shot her boyfriend in the face with a .22 several months later. In court the mother "testified that while she worked nights at a local truck stop he was ‘at home partying and harassing my daughter.'" Mann said "the child put it to me somewhat more directly". Mann says that she now looks at this photograph with "a jaggy chill of realization".

Immediate Family and controversy

Mann is widely known for Immediate Family, her third collection, first exhibited in 1990 by Edwynn Houk Gallery in Chicago and published as a monograph in 1992. The New York Times Magazine used a picture of her three children on the cover of its September 27, 1992 issue with a feature article on her "disturbing work". In it Richard B. Woodward wrote that "Probably no photographer in history has enjoyed such a burst of success in the art world". Immediate Family consists of 65 black and white photographs of her three children, all under the age of 10. Many of the pictures were taken at the family's remote summer cabin along the river, where the children played and swam in the nude. Many explore typical childhood activities (skinny dipping, reading the funnies, dressing up, vamping, napping, playing board games) but others touch on darker themes such as insecurity, loneliness, injury, sexuality and death. Sarah Parsons reflects on the challenges in categorising Mann's work, arguing it is neither "portraiture, nor documentary, or snapshot". Instead, Parsons argues the power of Mann's work is in the tension between private family life and the showing of that private life in the public sphere. She argues when these private moments are placed in the public eye, they are interpreted through societal codes such as, motherhood; allowing the viewer to interpret the narrative of the work through their subjective views. Additionally, Ann Beattie argues "...a pose is only a pose..." reinforcing the opinion that the controversy stems from adult's subjective interpretation of the narrative that pose creates. The controversy on its release was intense, including accusations of child pornography (both in America and abroad) and of contrived fiction with constructed tableaux.
 
Immediate Family entered the field around the early 90's, during which time politicians were cracking down on even the suspicion of child pornography to appeal to their constituents. Negative accountability forced suspected artists to justify their work, leading many such as Mann to self-censor or have their work removed from public spaces. Jeff Ferrell described this as “cultural criminalisation”, as the media manipulated public conceptions of cultural works, delegitimising artists like Mann, despite legal actions never being having brought against her.
 
This political movement impacted photography as an artform because of its links with law and evidence, Dillard S. Gardner argues the public saw photos as “the very highest type of evidence”. In her work ‘Models of Integrity: Art and Law in Post-Sixties America’ Joan Kee argues artists such as Mann and Jacqueline Livingston, were under heighted scrutiny. The passing of child pornography regulations meant film developers could withhold material they deemed immoral; with feminists such as Andrea Dworkin and Catherine Mackinnon arguing for the censorship of pornography. However, academics such as Connie Samaras criticized complaints from feminist groups, like women against pornography (WAP), about Mann's work arguing “nakedness, even if it suggests lawlessness… has central meaning to many people's lives for a wide variety of legitimate reasons.”
 
One of her detractors, Pat Robertson of the Christian Broadcasting Network, said that "selling photographs of children in their nakedness for profit is an exploitation of the parental role and I think it's wrong". He views such work as a violation of the responsibility of parents to do everything in their power to protect, shelter, and nurture their children. Furthermore, Mary Gordon argued Mann's work abused the power dynamic between mother and child. Gordon argued the placing of her children in sexualised positions invites the viewer to imagine the children as potential sexual partners which is unethical for a mother. She argues the sexual nature of Mann's work invites discussion of her children's sexuality; harmfully bringing part of the private sphere of the nucleus family into the public eye. More negative criticism came from Raymond Sokolov's article Critique: Censoring Virginia in the Wall Street Journal. He questioned whether children should be photographed nude and whether federal funds should be appropriated for such artworks. Accompanying his article was a modified image by Mann of her daughter Virginia (Virginia at 4), in which her eyes, nipples, and pubic region were now covered with black bars. Mann said he used the image without permission "to illustrate that this is the kind of thing that shouldn't be shown". Mann claimed that after Virginia saw the article, she started touching herself on the areas that were blacked out, saying, "what's wrong with me?" Mann responded to the criticisms saying she did not plan the photographs and that when she was young, she was often nude, so she raised her children similarly.
 
Many of her other photographs depicting her children caused controversy. For example, in The Perfect Tomato, the viewer sees a nude Jessie, posing on a picnic table outside, bathed in light. Mary Gordon argues "tomato" is slang to describes a desirable woman, the title, consequently, furthering the sexual themes and presenting her daughter as "sexually desirable". Jessie told Steven Cantor during the filming of one of his movies that she had just been playing around and her mother told her to freeze, and she tried to capture the image in a rush because the sun was setting. This explains why everything is blurred except for the tomato, hence the photograph's title. While Jessie was aware of this photograph, Dana Cox, in her essay, said that the Mann children were probably unaware of the other photographs being taken as Mann's children were often naked because "it came natural to them". This habit of nudity is a family thing because Mann says she used to walk around her house naked when she was growing up. Cox states that "the own artist's childhood is reflected in the way she captures moments in her children's lives".
 
Mann herself considered these photographs to be "natural through the eyes of a mother, since she has seen her children in every state: happy, sad, playful, sick, bloodied, angry and even naked". Deborah Chambers, in her work on family photo albums, reflects on their idyllic nature but also argues they rarely convey the actual experience of the family. Mann's work takes these idyllic photos meant for semi-private consumption and brings them to the public sphere. By working collaboratively with her children Mann uses these idealised family photos to create a narrative from her children's perspectives. Critics agreed, saying her "vision in large measure [is] accurate, and a welcome corrective to familiar notions of youth as a time of unalloyed sweetness and innocence", and that the book "created a place that looked like Eden, then cast upon it the subdued and shifting light of nostalgia, sexuality and death". When Time magazine named her "America's Best Photographer" in 2001, it wrote:
 
Mann recorded a combination of spontaneous and carefully arranged moments of childhood repose and revealingly — sometimes unnervingly — imaginative play. What the outraged critics of her child nudes failed to grant was the patent devotion involved throughout the project and the delighted complicity of her son and daughters in so many of the solemn or playful events. No other collection of family photographs is remotely like it, in both its naked candor and the fervor of its maternal curiosity and care.
 
The New Republic considered it "one of the great photograph books of our time".
 
Despite the controversy, Mann was never charged with the taking or selling of child pornography, even though, according to Edward de Grazia, law professor and civil liberties expert, "any federal prosecutor anywhere in the country could bring a case against [Mann] in Virginia, and not only seize her photos, her equipment, her Rolodexes, but also seize her children for psychiatric and physical examination". Before she published Immediate Family, she consulted a Virginia federal prosecutor who told her that some of the images she was exhibiting could have her arrested. In 1991, she decided to postpone the publication of the book. In an interview with New York Times reporter, Richard Woodward, she said "I thought the book could wait 10 years, when the kids won't be living in the same bodies. They'll have matured and they'll understand the implications of the pictures. I unilaterally decided."
 
To further protect the children from "teasing", Mann told Woodward that she wanted to keep copies of Immediate Family out of their home town of Lexington. She asked bookstores in the area not to sell it and for libraries to keep it in their rare-book rooms. Dr. Aaron Esman, a child psychiatrist at the Payne Whitney Clinic believes that Mann is serious about her work and that she has "no intention to jeopardize her children or use them for pornographic images". He says that the nude photographs don't appear to be erotically stimulating to anyone but a "case-hardened pedophile or a rather dogmatic religious fundamentalist". Mann stated, "I didn't expect the controversy over the pictures of my children. I was just a mother photographing her children as they were growing up. I was exploring different subjects with them."
 
Her fourth book, Still Time, published in 1994, was based on the catalogue of a traveling exhibition that included more than 20 years of her photography. The 60 images included more photographs of her children, but also earlier landscapes with color and abstract photographs.

Later career
In the mid-1990s, Mann began photographing landscapes on wet plate collodion 8x10 inch glass negatives, and used the same 100-year-old 8x10 format bellows view camera that she had used for all the previous bodies of work. These landscapes were first seen in Still Time, and later featured in two shows presented by the Edwynn Houk Gallery in NYC: Sally Mann – Mother Land: Recent Landscapes of Georgia and Virginia in 1997, and then in Deep South: Landscapes of Louisiana and Mississippi in 1999. Many of these large (40"x50") black-and-white and manipulated prints were taken using the 19th century "wet plate" process, or collodion, in which glass plates are coated with collodion, dipped in silver nitrate, and exposed while still wet. This gave the photographs what the New York Times called "a swirling, ethereal image with a center of preternatural clarity", and showed many flaws and artifacts, some from the process and some introduced by Mann.
 
Mann has been the subject of two film documentaries. The first, Blood Ties, directed by Steve Cantor and Peter Spirer, debuted at the 1994 Sundance Film Festival, and was nominated for an Academy Award as Best Documentary Short. The second, What Remains: The Life and Work of Sally Mann (2005) was also directed by Steve Cantor. It premiered at the 2006 Sundance Film Festival and was nominated for an Emmy for Best Documentary in 2008. In her New York Times review of the film, Ginia Bellafante wrote, "It is one of the most exquisitely intimate portraits not only of an artist's process, but also of a marriage and a life, to appear on television in recent memory."
 
Mann uses antique view cameras from the early 1890s. These cameras have wooden frames, accordion-like bellows and long lenses made out of brass, now held together by tape that has mold growing inside. This sort of camera, when used with vintage lenses, softens the light, which makes the pictures timeless.
 
A self-portrait (which also included her two daughters) was featured on the September 9, 2001 cover of The New York Times Magazine, for a theme issue on "Women Looking at Women".
 
Mann's fifth book, What Remains, published in 2003, is based on the show of the same name at the Corcoran Gallery in Washington, DC. The book is broken up into four sections: Matter Lent, December 8, 2000,  Antietam, and What Remains. The first section contains photographs of the remains of Eva, her greyhound, after decomposition, along with the photographs of dead and decomposing bodies at a federal forensic anthropology facility (known as the ‘body farm'). The second part details the site on her property where an armed escaped convict was killed in a shootout with police. The third part is a study of the grounds of Antietam, the site of the bloodiest single day battle in American history during the Civil War. The fourth part is a study of close-up faces of her children. Thus, this study of mortality, decay and death ends with hope and love.
 
Mann's sixth book, Deep South, published in 2005, with 65 black-and-white images, includes landscapes taken from 1992 to 2004 using both conventional 8x10 film and wet plate collodion. These photographs have been described as "haunted landscapes of the south, battlefields, decaying mansion, kudzu shrouded landscapes and the site where Emmett Till was murdered". Newsweek picked it as their book choice for the holiday season, saying that Mann "walks right up to every Southern stereotype in the book and subtly demolishes each in its turn by creating indelibly disturbing images that hover somewhere between document and dream".
 
Mann's seventh book, Proud Flesh, published in 2009, is a study taken over six years of the effects of muscular dystrophy on her husband Larry Mann. Mann photographed her husband using the collodion wet plate process As she notes, "The results of this rare reversal of photographic roles are candid, extraordinarily wrenching and touchingly frank portraits of a man at his most vulnerable moment." The project was displayed in Gagosian Gallery in October 2009.
 
Mann's eighth book, The Flesh and The Spirit, published in 2010, was released in conjunction with a comprehensive show at the Virginia Museum of Fine Arts in Richmond, Virginia. Regarding this exhibition, the museum director stated, "She follows her own voice. Her pictures are imbued with an amazing degree of soul." Though not strictly a retrospective, this 200-page book included new and recent work (unpublished self-portraits, landscapes, images of her husband, her children's faces, and of the dead at a forensic institute) as well as early works (unpublished color photographs of her children in the 1990s, color Polaroids, and platinum prints from the 1970s). Its unifying theme is the body, with its vagaries of illnesses and death, and includes essays by John Ravenal, David Levi Strauss, and Anne Wilkes Tucker.
 
In May 2011 she delivered the three-day Massey Lecture Series at Harvard, on the topic of how her extended family influenced her work. Her memoir Hold Still arose as a companion to the lecture. In June 2011, Mann sat down with one of her contemporaries, Nan Goldin, at Look3 Charlottesville Festival of the Photograph. The two photographers discussed their respective careers, particularly the ways in which photographing personal lives became a source of professional controversy. This was followed by an appearance at the University of Michigan as part of the Penny W. Stamps lecture series.
 
Mann's ninth book, Hold Still: A Memoir with Photographs, released May 12, 2015, is a melding of a memoir of her youth, an examination of some major influences of her life, and reflections on how photography shapes one's view of the world. It is augmented with numerous photographs, letters, and other memorabilia. She singles out her "near-feral" childhood and her subsequent introduction to photography at Putney, her relationship to her husband of 40 years and his parents' mysterious death, and her maternal Welsh relative's nostalgia for land morphing into her love for her land in the Shenandoah Valley, as some of her important influences. Gee-Gee, a black woman who was a surrogate parent, who opened Mann's eyes to race relations and exploitation, her relationship with local artist Cy Twombly, and her father's genteel southern legacy and his eventual death are also examined. She ponders the relationship Robert S. Munger, her great-grandfather and southern industrialist, had with his  workers. The New York Times described it as "an instant classic among Southern memoirs of the last 50 years". An article by Mann adapted from this book appeared with photographs in The New York Times Magazine in April 2015. Hold Still was a finalist for the 2015 National Book Award.
 
Mann's tenth book, Remembered Light: Cy Twombly in Lexington was published in 2016. It is an insider's photographic view of Cy Twombly's studio in Lexington. It was published concurrently with an exhibit of color and black-and-white photographs at the Gagosian Gallery. It shows the overflow of Twombly's general modus operandi: the leftovers, smears, and stains, or, as Simon Schama said in his essay at the start of the book, "an absence turned into a presence".
 
Mann's eleventh book, Sally Mann: A Thousand Crossings, authored by Sarah Greenough and Sarah Kennel, is a large (320 pages) compendium of works spanning 40 years, with 230 photographs by Mann. It served as a catalog for an exhibit at the National Gallery of Art entitled Sally Mann: A Thousand Crossings which opened March 4, 2018 and was the first major survey of the artist's work to travel internationally.
 
In her recent projects, Mann has started exploring the issues of race and legacy of slavery that were a central theme of her memoir Hold Still. They include a series of portraits of black men, all made during one-hour sessions in the studio with models not previously known to her. Mann was inspired by Bill T. Jones' use of the Walt Whitman 1856 poem "Poem of the Body" in his art, and Mann "borrowed the idea, using the poem as a template for [her] own exploration". Several pictures from this body of work were highlighted in Aperture Foundation magazine in the summer of 2016. and they also appeared in A Thousand Crossings. This book and exhibit also introduced a series of photographs of African American historic churches photographed on expired film, and a series of tintype photographs of a swamp that served as refuge for escaped slaves. Some critics see in Mann's work a deep working through of the legacy of white violence in the South, while others have voiced concern that Mann's work at times repeats rather than critiques tropes of white domination and violence in the American southeast.

Personal life
Mann, born and raised in Virginia, is the daughter of Robert Munger and Elizabeth Munger. In Mann's introduction for her book Immediate Family, she "expresses stronger memories for the black woman, Virginia Carter, who oversaw her upbringing than for her own mother". Elizabeth Munger was not a big part of Mann's life, and Elizabeth said "Sally may look like me, but inside she's her father's child." Virginia (Gee-Gee) Carter, born in 1894, raised Mann and her two brothers and was an admirable woman. "Left with six children and a public education system for which she paid taxes but which forbade classes for black children beyond the seventh grade, Gee-Gee managed somehow to send each of them to out-of-state boarding schools and, ultimately, to college." Virginia Carter died in 1994.
 
In 1969 Sally met Larry Mann, and in 1970 they married. Larry Mann is an attorney and, before practicing law, he was a blacksmith. Larry was diagnosed with muscular dystrophy around 1996. They live together in their home which they built on Sally's family's farm in Lexington, Virginia.
 
They have three children together: Emmett (born 1979), who took his own life in 2016, after a life-threatening car collision and a subsequent battle with schizophrenia, and who for a time served in the Peace Corps; Jessie (born 1981), who herself is an artist; and Virginia (born 1985), a lawyer.
 
Mann is passionate about endurance horse racing. In 2006, her Arabian horse ruptured an aneurysm while she was riding him. In the horse's death throes, Mann was thrown to the ground, the horse rolled over her, and the impact broke her back. It took her two years to recover from the accident and during this time, she made a series of ambrotype self-portraits. These self-portraits were on view for the first time in November 2010 at the Virginia Museum of Fine Arts as a part of Sally Mann: the Flesh and the Spirit.

Publications

Books
 
 At Twelve: Portraits of Young Women. Aperture, New York, 1988. 
 Immediate Family. Aperture, New York, 1992. 
 Still Time. Aperture, New York, 1994. 
 
 
 Sally Mann (2005), 21st Editions, South Dennis, MA (edition of 110)
 Sally Mann: Proud Flesh. Aperture Press; Gagosian Gallery, New York, 2009. 
 
 Southern Landscape (2013), 21st Editions, South Dennis, MA (edition of 58)

Exhibition catalogues
 The Lewis Law Portfolio, at Corcoran Gallery of Art, Washington DC, 1977
 Sweet Silent Thought, at the North Carolina Center for Creative Photography, Durham, NC, 1987
 Still Time, at the Alleghany Highland Arts and Crafts Center, Clifton Forge, VA, 1988
 Mother Land, at the Edwynn Houk Gallery, New York, 1997
 Sally Mann, at the Gagosian Gallery, New York, 2006
 Sally Mann: Deep South/Battlefields, at the Kulturhuset, Stockholm, Sweden, 2007

Collections
 
 
 Ferdinand Protzman, Landscape: Photographs of time and Place. National Geographic, 2003. 
 R. H. Cravens, Photography Past/Forward: Aperture at 50. Aperture Press, 2005.

Other

Film and television 
 Blood Ties: The Life and Work of Sally Mann. Directed by Steven Cantor and Peter Spirer. Moving Target Productions. 30 minutes, color, DVD.  Nomination for an Academy Award for Best Documentary: Short Subject (1992)
 "Giving Up the Ghost". Egg, The Arts Show. Produced by Mary Recine for Thirteen/WNET, New York. (2002)
 "Place". Episode One. Art 21- Directed by Catherine Tatge, Art in the Twenty-First Century for PBS Broadcasting, Virginia. 14 minutes. Color. DVD. (2002)
What Remains: The Life and Work of Sally Mann. Directed by Steven Cantor. Zeitgeist Films, New York. 80 minutes, color, DVD. (2004). Winner of Best Documentary. Jacksonville Film Festival.  Won Grand Jury Prize for Best Documentary Film. Nantucket Film Festival Won Best Storytelling in Documentary Film. Nantucket Film Festival Official Selection. Sundance Film Festival New York Loves Film Documentary Award. Tribeca Film Festival. (2006)
 "Some Things Are Private". Playwrights Deborah Salem Smith, Laura Kepley. Trinity Repertory Theatre, Dowling Theater. Providence, RI.  (2008)
 "The Genius of Photography: We Are Family". Episode 6. BBC Four Productions, Wall to Wall Media Ltd. (2008)
 "Thalia Book Club: Sally Mann Hold Still". Ann Patchett, Symphony Space (May 13, 2015)

Awards
 2001: Time magazine named Mann "America's Best Photographer"
 2006: Honorary Doctor of Fine Arts degree from the Corcoran College of Art + Design.
 2012: Honorary Fellowship of the Royal Photographic Society (UK)
 2016: Andrew Carnegie Medal for Excellence in Nonfiction for Hold Still: A Memoir in Photographs.
 2020: Centenary Medal, Royal Photographic Society, Bristol, UK
 2021: Inducted into the International Photography Hall of Fame on October 29, 2021 
 2021: Prix Pictet's ninth global photography award

Collections
Mann's work is held in the following permanent collections:
 Metropolitan Museum of Art
 National Gallery of Art
 Hirshhorn Museum and Sculpture Garden
 Museum of Fine Arts, Boston
 San Francisco Museum of Modern Art
 Whitney Museum, New York City: 12 prints (as of October 2020)

References

External links
 
 Article about Sally Mann
 The main works of Mann
 TV interview with Charlie Rose in 2016
 Sally Mann Exhibition at Gagosian Gallery
 
 

American portrait photographers
Nude photography
1951 births
Living people
Bennington College alumni
Hollins University alumni
People from Lexington, Virginia
The Putney School alumni
20th-century American photographers
21st-century American photographers
20th-century American writers
21st-century American writers
20th-century American women writers
21st-century American women writers
Photographers from Virginia
20th-century American women photographers
21st-century American women photographers